Acalathus is a genus of ground beetles in the family Carabidae. There are about 13 described species in Acalathus, found in China.

Species
These 13 species belong to the genus Acalathus:

 Acalathus businskyi (Lassalle, 1999)
 Acalathus drolmae Lassalle, 1999
 Acalathus fallax (Semenov, 1889)
 Acalathus kangdingensis Lassalle, 2011
 Acalathus langmusiensis (Lassalle, 1999)
 Acalathus luhuoensis Lassalle, 1999
 Acalathus nanpingensis (Lassalle, 1999)
 Acalathus semirufescens Semenov, 1889
 Acalathus shaanxiensis (Lassalle, 2011)
 Acalathus validulus Tschitscherine, 1896
 Acalathus wrzecionkoi Lassalle, 1999
 Acalathus xiahensis Lassalle, 1999
 Acalathus yunnanicus (Lassalle, 2011)

References

Platyninae